Richard Henry FitzRoy Somerset, 2nd Baron Raglan (24 May 1817 – 3 May 1884) was a British peer.

Life
The second son of FitzRoy Somerset, 1st Baron Raglan, he was born in Paris and educated at Christ Church, Oxford. He went to Ceylon with Lieutenant-General Sir Colin Campbell KCB (1776 – 13 June 1847) as his Private Secretary and was subsequently taken into the Ceylon civil service in 1841. In 1844 he was the assistant government agent of Colombo. He left the island in 1849 to become the private secretary of George V of Hanover, leaving that office in 1855 when he succeeded to his father's title. Parliament granted him and his successor a pension of £2,000 for the service of his father (23 July 1855). He was a Cornet in the Gloucestershire Yeomanry from 1856, and Captain 1864–75. He became a Lord-in-waiting from 1858 to 1859 and 1866–69, under The Earl of Derby's and Disraeli's governments respectively.

The family seat is Cefntilla Court in Llandenny, Monmouthshire. An inscription over the porch dated 1858 reads: "This house with 238 acres of land was purchased by 1623 of the friends, admirers and comrades in arms of the late Field Marshal Lord Raglan GCB and presented by them to his son and his heirs for ever in a lasting memorial of affectionate regard and respect".

He died in Chesterfield Street, London on 3 May 1884 and was buried in Llandenny churchyard, Monmouthshire, on 8 May.

Family
On 25 September 1856 Somerset married Lady Georgina Lygon, the third daughter of Henry Lygon, 4th Earl Beauchamp, and they later had five children. After the death of his wife in 1865, he married Mary Blanche Farquhar, the eldest daughter of Sir Walter Farquhar, 3rd Baronet, on 11 October 1871 and they had one daughter.

Notes

Ancestry

1817 births
1884 deaths
Richard Somerset, 2nd Baron Raglan
Barons in the Peerage of the United Kingdom
Alumni of Christ Church, Oxford
Conservative Party (UK) Baronesses- and Lords-in-Waiting
Deputy Lieutenants of Monmouthshire
Royal Gloucestershire Hussars officers
Younger sons of barons